Jamie Campbell is an American comedian, actor, improviser and playwright.

Early life
Campbell grew up in Pryor, Oklahoma. Between kindergarten and his senior year he attended thirteen different schools, and recalls "to make new friends, being funny really helped." He attended Northeastern State University in Tahlequah, OK. He received awards in Academic Achievement, Best Supporting Actor, Outstanding Theatre Student and the Jack Kaufman Outstanding Senior. Campbell was a member of Alpha Psi Omega, and served as president, vice president, treasurer and points chair. As a Northeastern State University student, he also served in the Oklahoma Army National Guard.

After graduating from NSU, he interned at the Wayside Theatre in Middletown, Virginia, landing roles in Steve Martin's adaption of The Underpants, The Killer Angels and A Christmas Story. After leaving Wayside, Campbell entered the graduate theater program at Oklahoma State University.  He starred as King Henry in The Lion in Winter and Brutus in Julius Caesar. While at Oklahoma State University, he applied for a semester at Columbia College with the Second City, in Chicago, Illinois, and decided to leave the graduate program and focus on a career in comedy. He also co-wrote a play entitled four play.

Career
Campbell began doing stand-up comedy in 2008. In 2012, Campbell performed as former mayor Richard M. Daley at RedEye's 10th anniversary at Laugh Factory. He was named Best Stand-Up Comedian by the Chicago Reader, in 2013. He names The Shithole in Chicago as his favorite venue, which he explains is "run by a couple of guys who produce their shows out of an attic and a stand-alone garage." 
 
Campbell signed with New Jersey independent record label Mint 400 Records in 2015, and released his debut stand-up album Tell Me You're Proud of Me on March 10, 2015. His album was recorded at Wild Goose Creative in Columbus, Ohio at the Columbus Unscripted Improv Festival. Tell Me You're Proud of Me focuses on ego, love, family, childhood and adulthood. He supported the release with a tour across the United States, and the album's success raised his profile. In a Chicago Tribune article spotlighting stand-up comedians, Campbell explains where he gets his material from; "I tell them Jo-Ann Fabrics." His routines are described as "fast and funny" in a 2015 piece by the Daily Herald, and Monique Madrid of New York calls Campbell "one of the hardest working comedians in Chicago." On November 17, 2015, he released the album Stocking Stuffer on Mint 400 Records.

Campbell appears in the Chicago Fire episode "Forgiving, Relentless, Unconditional" as a bartender. He also appears in Hotline, The Rancid Wrestler, the indie film Sex Ain't Love and has a starring role in the film Dirtbags. Campbell was the host of the live, weekly late-night talk show Talk Hard, and is a former ensemble member of The ComedySportz Theatre and The Annoyance Theatre's house ensemble. He is also the founder of the stand-up collective 100 Proof Comedy. Campbell is a core cast member in the webseries Lunch & Learn.

His one-man show, The Devil on the Wall was the only solo show named Best of Fest at the 2018 Kansas City Fringe Festival. A reviewer from the Arizona Daily Star notes of a 2019 performance, "throughout this immersive autobiography, we, as an audience, laughed, gasped and empathized as the often jovial ride halted at poignant emotional places," adding "the story has been so well thought-out [...] that I found myself too captivated to look away even for a second." Conceptually the show is about abuse, bullying and juvenile delinquency.

Currently Campbell resides in Kansas City, Missouri, where he is a member of the professional ensemble The KC Improv Company.

Discography

Albums
Tell Me You're Proud of Me (2015)
Stocking Stuffer (2015)

References

Citations

Bibliography

External links

American male comedians
American stand-up comedians
Living people
Mint 400 Records artists
Year of birth missing (living people)